Albert Salomon Anselm von Rothschild
Albert Salomon (sociologist), German sociologist
Albert Salomon (surgeon), German surgeon
Albert Salomon (musician), Bulgarian-Israeli troubadour and accordionist